Doddmane Hudga  is a 2016 Indian Kannada-language action drama film co-written and directed by Duniya Soori, featuring Puneeth Rajkumar and Radhika Pandit. The film also features an ensemble cast of Ambareesh, Sumalatha, Bharathi Vishnuvardhan, Krishna, Srinivasa Murthy, P. Ravi Shankar, Rangayana Raghu, Chikkanna and Avinash, with Shiva Rajkumar providing a voice-over. This film marks the 25th film of Puneeth Rajkumar in a lead role.

This film marks third collaboration between Puneeth and Soori. The film was produced by M. Govindu under Ajay Pictures banner. Music was composed by V. Harikrishna and art direction by Shashidhar Adapa. The principal photography commenced on 5 March 2015. The film was released worldwide on 30 September 2016 to positive reviews and it was commercially successful.

Plot
Surya is a short-tempered youngster, who cooks biriyani at a local market. He meets Usha, where he saves her from goons and drops her off at a drama studio, where it is revealed that Usha is Nisha, who is participating in a drama. Cable Babu is a goon who wants to become a politician. When his goons were setting a shop on fire, they were all thrashed by Doddmane Rajeeva. When his son Krishna robs some jewellery, Rajeeva humiliates him. Krishna joins hands with Babu to humiliate Rajeeva. After that, Babu steals all the land documents that belong to the farmers leading to Rajeeva's arrest. 

Surya's father, Mallanna suffers a stroke and gets admitted to the hospital.  In need of money to save Mallanna, Surya takes the job of assassinating Rajeeva, and goes to prison to kill Rajeeva. However, Surya fights a prisoner who was about to kill Rajeeva and is also sent to prison, where it is revealed that Surya is Rajeeva's long-lost son, but Surya hates him and reveals to Nisha that his father did not care for him in his childhood. Surya reconciles with the rest of his family and returns home. After a cat-and-mouse game between Surya and Cable Babu, which results in Krishna apologizing for his misdeeds and Cable Babu's brother Manja getting killed. 

Rajeeva reveals that he didn't care for him because he promised his sister that he would always care for Krishna; this is the case that he didn't care for Surya in his childhood. Cable Babu stabs Rajeeva. Surya thrashes Babu and throws him in a tunnel, where Babu's assistant kills Babu by burying him alive. Surya brings the documents and Rajeeva recovers, where he distributes the documents back to the farmers, who realize their mistake and apologizes to Rajeeva. The families reconcile and happily celebrate their village festival.

Cast 
 Puneeth Rajkumar as Doddmane Surya, Rajeeva's son
 Ambareesh as Doddmane Rajeeva
 Sumalatha as Doddmane Rajeeva's wife
 Radhika Pandit as Usha/Nisha, Surya's love interest
 Bharathi Vishnuvardhan as Doddmane Rajeeva's sister / Doddmane Krishna's mother
 Srinivasa Murthy as Mallanna, Surya's foster parent
 Krishna as Doddmane Krishna, Rajeeva's nephew
 P. Ravi Shankar as Cable Babu
 Rangayana Raghu as Nanjunda, Surya's uncle
 Chikkanna as Lawanga/Langa, Surya's friend
 Avinash as Lawyer Subramanya, Nisha's father
 Udaya Raghav as Karate Manja, Cable Babu's younger brother
Prashanth Siddi as Surya's friend
 Dattanna
 Sudheer Cockroach 
 Mico Nagaraj as Patela
 Stunt Siddu 
 K. S. L. Swamy
 Sathyajith as Gowda
 Honnavalli Krishna
 Dharaneendrayya

Production

Development
In February 2014, it was reported that Soori and Puneeth Rajkumar would work together again under Ajay Pictures. V. Harikrishna was selected to compose the music for this film. The song recording was launched at the Prasad Recording Studios in Bangalore on 24 April 2014. Art director Shashidhar Adapa was selected to handle art direction for the film. Satya Hegde was selected to handle the film's cinematography.

Casting
In July 2014, it was reported that Ramya would play the female lead of the movie but later she walked out of the movie citing "remuneration problems". After Ramya's exit Radhika Pandit was roped to play lead actress role which marked her second collaboration with Puneeth Rajkumar. Rebel star Ambareesh and Sumalatha were signed for portraying the parents role of Puneeth Rajkumar in the movie. Veteran actress Bharathi Vishnuvardhan was chosen to play the role of Ambareesh's sister in the movie. Srinivasa Murthy, Chikkanna, Rangayana Raghu, P. Ravi Shankar, Avinash, Udaya Raghav and Santosh Aryavardan of Bigboss 2 fame were chosen to play crucial role in the movie.

Filming
Principal photography began on 5 March 2015 at the temple of Ganesha in Sadashivanagar, Bangalore. Parvathamma Rajkumar, actors V. Ravichandran, Shiva Rajkumar, Raghavendra Rajkumar, Srinivasa Murthy, Bharathi Vishnuvardhan, Radhika Pandit, Vinay Rajkumar, Imran Sardhariya were among the film personalities present at the event.

Soundtrack

V. Harikrishna was signed to compose the soundtrack album and background score for the film. The song recording of the movie commenced on 24 April 2014, the birth anniversary of actor Rajkumar at Prasad Studios in Bangalore. Lyrics for the soundtrack were written by Jayanth Kaykini, Yogaraj Bhat and V. Nagendra Prasad. The soundtrack album consists of five tracks. The first track "Abhimanigale" was released on 14 August by Shivakumara Swami.

Track listing

References

External links
 

2010s Kannada-language films
2016 films
2016 action drama films
Films scored by V. Harikrishna
Indian action drama films
Films shot in Bangalore
2016 masala films
Films directed by Duniya Soori